The Mahishadal Rathayatra is held annually in Mahishadal in Purba Medinipur District, West Bengal. The Ratha Yatra was founded by Janaki Devi of Mahishadal estate in the year 1776.

See also 
 Mahesh Rathayatra
 Guptipara Rathayatra
 Dhamrai Rathayatra

References 

Festivals in West Bengal
Purba Medinipur district
Tourist attractions in Purba Medinipur district